Linda B. Rosenthal (born November 12, 1957) represents District 67 as a Democrat in the New York State Assembly, which includes parts of Manhattan's Upper West Side and Clinton/Hell's Kitchen neighborhoods.

Early life
Linda Rosenthal was born in 1957 to parents who fled the Nazis in the 1930s. Rosenthal earned a B.A. degree in History from the University of Rochester in 1980.

Career
In 1993, Rosenthal began working for US Congressman (for New York's 10th congressional district) Jerry Nadler and served as Manhattan District Director and Director of Special Projects. Prior to this, she worked in publishing.

Rosenthal was elected to the New York State Assembly in a February 2006 special election for District 67 between four candidates to replace Scott Stringer, who left the Assembly to become Manhattan Borough President.  Rosenthal won the November 2008 general election with 84.7 percent of the vote, and ran uncontested in the November 2010 general election.

In the Assembly, Rosenthal is the chair for the Alcohol and Drug Abuse Committee, and sits on the Codes, Housing, Health, and Agriculture committees.  In 2006, the New York State Legislature passed Assemblymember Rosenthal's landmark legislation allowing court orders of protection to be extended to companion animals; it has also passed laws she proposed requiring applicants of public assistance to be provided with resources for victims of sexual assault, allowing for same-sex couples to adopt non-biological children, eliminating the state sales tax on feminine hygiene products; and prohibiting the sale of electronic cigarettes to minors.

In May 2015, fellow Manhattan Democrat Richard N. Gottfried tried to curb a bill introduced by Rosenthal that would allow customers to bring their dogs to outdoor restaurants, because Gottfried was afraid larger breeds would be able to grab food from tabletops. Gottfried said: "Some dogs are tall enough that all they would have to do is turn their heads and they would be eating off people’s plates." A similar bill that passed in California has not resulted in any problems, and the practice is also legal in Israel and some European countries, and common in Europe and in Los Angeles. The bill passed the Senate in May 2015 by a 60-0 vote.  In March 2016, follows the State Legislature’s passage of her bill, the New York City Department of Health and Mental Hygiene issued an advisory allowing dogs to accompany human diners at restaurants that have outdoor seating, joining service dogs which were already allowed in virtually all situations.

In March 2019, she introduced a bill, A5040, that will ban a sale of fur in New York, by 2021. New York would follow California, which is in the process of legislating the ban.

Also in 2019, New York passed Rosenthal's bill A1303B, the first statewide law to ban cat declawing in the United States.  Assemblymember Rosenthal worked closely with the nonprofit animal advocacy organization, The Paw Project, to pass the bill.

In 2021, Rosenthal introduced a bill banning the mailing of live animals to and within New York State. The bill is in opposition to federal law as the United States Post Office, a federal agency, cannot be regulated by states. The bill was sent to the agriculture committee where it will likely not progress.

Personal life 
Rosenthal resides on the Upper West Side of Manhattan. Although she shares a last name with City Council member Helen Rosenthal and represents the same area, they are not related.

Election results
 February 2006 special election, NYS Assembly, 67th AD
{| class="Wikitable"
| Linda B. Rosenthal (DEM – WOR) || ... || 5,694
|-
| Charles A. Simon (WSP) || ... || 2,254
|-
| Emily A. Csendes (REP) || ... || 875
|-
| Michael Lupinacci (IND – NLP) || ... || 603
|}

 November 2006 general election, NYS Assembly, 67th AD
{| class="Wikitable"
| Linda B. Rosenthal (DEM – WOR) || ... || 33,909
|-
| Theodore Howard (REP) || ... || 4,469
|}

 November 2008 general election, NYS Assembly, 67th AD
{| class="Wikitable"
| Linda B. Rosenthal (DEM – WOR) || ... || 46,780
|-
| Eleanor Friedman (REP) || ... || 8,825
|}

 November 2010 general election, NYS Assembly, 67th AD
{| class="Wikitable"
| Linda B. Rosenthal (DEM – WOR) || ... || 32,283
|}

 November 2012 general election, NYS Assembly, 67th AD
{| class="Wikitable"
| Linda B. Rosenthal (DEM – WOR) || ... || 43,196
|-
| Julia Willebrand (GRE) || ... || 2,298
|}

 November 2014 general election, NYS Assembly, 67th AD
{| class="Wikitable"
| Linda B. Rosenthal (DEM – WOR) || ... || 23,576
|}

 September 2016 primary election, NYS Assembly, 67th AD
{| class="Wikitable"
| Linda B. Rosenthal (DEM) || ... || 8,055
|-
| Eugene G.P. Byrne (DEM) || ... || 295
|}

 November 2016 general election, NYS Assembly, 67th AD
{| class="Wikitable"
| Linda B. Rosenthal (DEM – WOR) || ... || 52,482
|-
| Hyman Drusin (REP) || ... || 8,510
|}

References

External links
Linda Rosenthal Official website.
New York State Assembly Member Website
NY Dems Biography.

1957 births
Living people
Jewish American state legislators in New York (state)
Democratic Party members of the New York State Assembly
People from the Upper West Side
University of Rochester alumni
Women state legislators in New York (state)
21st-century American politicians
21st-century American women politicians
21st-century American Jews